Ahmed Yahiaoui (born 12 January 1987) is a French former professional footballer who played as a midfielder.

Club career
Whilst at Olympique de Marseille, Yahiaoui was a target for Chelsea F.C. but the club was unsuccessful in its attempts to signing him, as Marseille had persuaded him to stay with the squad. At the beginning of his career, Yahiaoui played for France U17. However, he failed to make an impact at Marseille, in contrast to his teammate Samir Nasri. He left the squad to play one year for the Ligue 2 side FC Istres, before joining FC Sion, from where he was released at the beginning of 2007.

Yahiaoui an unsuccessful week-long trial with Everton F.C. in an attempt to secure a permanent deal as David Moyes was looking to strengthen his squad before the start of the 2007–08 Premier League season. He signed a contract for a year and a half with AS Cannes in December 2007 on a free transfer.

Honours
France
 UEFA European Under-17 Football Championship: 2004

External links

References

French footballers
Algerian footballers
Ligue 1 players
Ligue 2 players
Olympique de Marseille players
FC Istres players
FC Sion players
AS Cannes players
French sportspeople of Algerian descent
1987 births
Living people
France youth international footballers
CS Sedan Ardennes players
Athlético Marseille players
MC Oran players
Association football midfielders